Ivan Dinev (born November 8, 1978) is a Bulgarian former competitive figure skater. He is a three-time Grand Prix medalist, an 11-time Bulgarian national champion, and competed at three Olympics.

Career 
In the 1997–98 season, Dinev won two gold medals on the ISU Junior Series and qualified for the Final where he took the silver medal. He competed at his first Olympics in 1998, finishing 11th. 

At the 1999 World Championships, Dinev became the first Bulgarian skater to land a quadruple toe loop in competition. He won bronze at the 1999 Trophée Lalique, becoming the first skater from his country to medal at a Grand Prix event. 

At the 2000 Sparkassen Cup, Dinev's blade broke during a warmup before the free skate; he bought a replacement of a different brand and finished 5th. He went on to win bronze at two other GP events, the 2001 Cup of Russia and 2001 NHK Trophy. 

Dinev trained in Sofia, Bulgaria until the end of the 2001–02 season. He finished 13th at his second Olympics in 2002. Dinev then moved to Lake Arrowhead, California to work with Rafael Arutyunyan. He missed his 2002 Grand Prix events due to a broken leg. From 2004 to 2005, he was coached by Igor Pashkevich in Los Angeles and Sofia.

In the 2005–06 season, Dinev was coached by Angela Nikodinov. He competed at his third Olympics, finishing 17th, and retired from competition at the end of the season. 

Dinev and Nikodinov coach together in Harbor City, California. In spring 2016, they became the coaches of Kaitlyn Nguyen, who won the 2017 U.S. junior ladies' title.

Personal life 
Dinev was born on November 8, 1978 in Sofia, Bulgaria. His son, Ivan Jr., from his first marriage was born in spring 2002. He is currently married to Angela Nikodinov, an American of Bulgarian descent. Their daughter was born in May 2012.

Programs

Competitive highlights 
GP: Grand Prix; JGP: Junior Series (Junior Grand Prix)

References

External links
 

1978 births
Living people
Bulgarian male single skaters
Figure skaters at the 2006 Winter Olympics
Figure skaters at the 2002 Winter Olympics
Figure skaters at the 1998 Winter Olympics
Olympic figure skaters of Bulgaria
Figure skaters from Sofia
Bulgarian emigrants to the United States